Mecyclothorax najtae is a species of ground beetle in the subfamily Psydrinae. It was described by Deuve in 1987.

References

najtae
Beetles described in 1987